Philip Milledoler Brett, Sr. (February 17, 1871 – July 2, 1960) was the thirteenth President of Rutgers University, serving in an acting capacity from 1930 to 1931.

Biography
He was born in Newark, New Jersey and was the great-great-grandson of Philip Milledoler. While attending Rutgers, he was the captain of the football team that played Princeton University in 1892 in which he was apocryphally credited with saying: "I'd die to win this game." He graduated with a baccalaureate degree from Rutgers College in 1892, and then received a Bachelor of Laws (LL.B.) from the New York Law School and a degree from the New Brunswick Theological Seminary.

He married and had two children: Philip Milledoler Brett, Jr. and Margaret Brett Tenney.

He received an honorary degree from Rutgers University in 1916. At the time of his selection as acting president, Brett was made a partner in the Manhattan law firm of Nevius, Brett and Kellogg in 1898.

During the Great Depression, the university was in disagreement with the newly established State Board of Regents, and morale was low among the faculty. After eighteen months, morale was restored and despite the requests of faculty for him to accept a full appointment as president, Brett declined. He continued his service as a Trustee of the university for over fifty years.

He retired from law in 1948, and died on July 2, 1960, at his home in Manhattan.

References

External links
 Rutgers biography
 Time magazine; 10 November 1930

1871 births
1960 deaths
Presidents of Rutgers University
New York Law School alumni